Porocephalida is an order of tongue worms. Some species in this order, such as Armillifer grandis, have been found in vipers, with some found in vipers from bushmeat markets.

Superfamilies and families 
There are four families recognised in the order Porocephalida.
 Linguatuloidea
 Linguatulidae
 Subtriquetridae
 Porocephaloidea
 Porocephalidae 
 Sebekidae

References 

Crustacean orders